Latibeaudiere is a surname. Notable people with the surname include:

Derick Latibeaudiere (born 1951), Jamaican businessman and banker
Joel Latibeaudiere (born 2000), English footballer